The Party for Democracy and Socialism/Metba (abbreviated PDS/Metba) is a political party in Burkina Faso. PDS/Metba was founded on 31 March 2012 through the merger of Party for Democracy and Socialism of Hama Arba Diallo, African Independence Party of Philippe Ouédraogo, the Citizens League of Builders of Dr. Jean-Marie Sanou and Faso Metba of Etienne Traoré. At the founding congress of the party, Hama Arba Diallo was elected chairman of the party, Etienne Traoré and Jean-Marie Sanou as vice chairmen and Ibrahima Koné et au and Blaise Somé (Professor at the University of Ouagadougou) as general secretaries.

References

2012 establishments in Burkina Faso
Communist parties in Burkina Faso
Political parties established in 2012
Political parties in Burkina Faso